Marc de Mauny (born March 1, 1971) is a theatre manager and opera producer.

Biography 

De Mauny was born in 1971 in Paris to British parents. His father, Erik de Mauny, was a celebrated BBC foreign correspondent, who established the Moscow bureau of the BBC in the 1960s. Both paternal grandparents were professional musicians (his grandfather Leon de Mauny studied violin with Eugène Ysaÿe). Marc de Mauny is married to artist Polina de Mauny. They have two children, Louis-Nicolai (born in St Petersburg in 2005) and Leon (born in St Petersburg in 2008).

Education 

De Mauny went to school in France then to the Jesuit school Stonyhurst College, Lancashire. He read Modern Languages (French and Russian) at Cambridge University (Pembroke College), graduating in 1994. De Mauny spent the academic year 1992-1993 studying singing and violin at the Saint Petersburg Conservatory.

Career 

From 1998 to 2000 de Mauny was Arts Officer at the British Council in St Petersburg. In this capacity he was responsible for the arts programme of the 300th anniversary celebrations of Peter I’s Great Embassy to England. In 1998 de Mauny founded the St Petersburg International Early Music Festival together with violinist Andrei Reshetin as artistic director. De Mauny left the Festival in 2007 to join Raiffeisenbank in Moscow as head of public relations in charge of sponsorship policy and philanthropy. He returned to the arts sector in 2010 as director of development at the Mikhailovsky Theatre, St Petersburg. In 2011 de Mauny was appointed General Manager of the Perm Opera and Ballet Theatre in the Urals (artistic director Teodor Currentzis). and Executive Producer of the International Diaghilev Festival., position which he held until returning to France in 2015. From Paris he managed the international touring activity of musicAeterna, and residencies at the festivals of Aix-en-Provence, Salzburg and Ruhr Triennale. In 2019 de Mauny set up a production company, Pont Neuf, Performing Fine Arts which fosters creative collaborations between visual and performing artists. From 2020 to 2022 Marc de Mauny was General Director of the new Festival Ravel in Saint-Jean-de-Luz, which he established together with Jean-François Heisser and Bertrand Chamayou.

References 

Living people
1971 births